Charles Stanislas Marion (May 7, 1758 – September 7, 1812) was a French general of the First French Empire during the Napoleonic Wars. He started his military service in 1776. He was promoted to general de brigade (brigadier general) in 1805. He was killed in action at the Battle of Borodino. He was the father of Charles Louis François Marion, 3rd Baron and grandfather of Charles Louis Raoul Marion, 4th Baron.

Coat of arms

Notes

References
 
 

1758 births
1812 deaths
Commandeurs of the Légion d'honneur
Barons of the First French Empire
Military personnel killed in the Napoleonic Wars
Generals of the First French Empire
Names inscribed under the Arc de Triomphe